Joseph Haydn's Symphony 'B' in B major, Hoboken I/108, was written between 1757 and 1760, and was one of his earliest symphonies.

It does not fall into the usual numbering scheme of Haydn's symphonies because it had later been published without its wind parts as a "Partita".

It is scored for 2 oboes, bassoon, 2 horns, strings and continuo.

Allegro molto, 
Menuetto & Trio (Trio in E major). Allegretto, 
Andante in G minor
Presto

The trio of the minuet contains a dialogue between solo viola and solo bassoon.

Notes

Symphony 108
Compositions in B-flat major